Ettamogah is a closed railway station on the Main South railway line in New South Wales, Australia. The station opened in 1881 and closed in 1975. Little trace remains of it today.

References

Disused regional railway stations in New South Wales
Railway stations in Australia opened in 1881
Railway stations closed in 1975
Main Southern railway line, New South Wales